The Airlake Terminal Railway , a subsidiary of Progressive Rail, is a short line railroad operating approximately  of track in a large industrial park in Lakeville, Minnesota. Typical traffic includes various bulk commodities and cargo for trans-shipment to trucks at warehouses operated in conjunction with its parent company, Progressive Rail.

References
Airlake Terminal Railway Company-Acquisition and Operation Exemption-Rail Line of Empire Builder Investments Incorporated and Progressive Rail, Incorporated

Companies based in Minnesota
Railway companies established in 2002
Transportation in Dakota County, Minnesota
Minnesota railroads
2002 establishments in Minnesota